Sainte-Suzanne is a commune on the north coast of the French island and department of Réunion, an island located approximately 950 km (590 mi) east of the island of Madagascar.

Geography 
It is bordered by the communes of Saint-André, Sainte-Marie and Salazie. The course of the Saint-Jean River denoted the border between Saint-André and Saint-Suzanne. Quartier-Français is a village in this commune.

Climate

Sainte-Suzanne has a humid subtropical climate (Köppen climate classification Cfa) closely bordering on a tropical rainforest climate (Af).

History 
The town, along with Saint-Denis, was founded in 1667 by Étienne Regnault, the first governor of the island.

Population

Personalities
The following people were natives of Sainte-Suzanne:
Edmond Albius (1829–1880), a slave who discovered the artificial pollination of vanilla.
Élie Hoarau (born 1938), politician.
René-Paul Victoria (born 1954), politician.

See also
Niagara Falls (Réunion)
Communes of the Réunion department

References

External links
 CINOR Site

 
Communes of Réunion